Norbert Wojtuszek (5 October 2001) is a Polish professional footballer who plays as a midfielder for Górnik Zabrze.

References

External links
 
 

2001 births
Living people
Footballers from Kraków
Association football midfielders
Polish footballers
Górnik Zabrze players
Ekstraklasa players
II liga players
III liga players